HIW or Hiw may refer to:

Places
 Hiw, or Hu, Egypt
 Hiroshima-Nishi Airport, by IATA code
 Hiw (island), the northernmost island of Vanuatu

Others
 Hiw language, spoken on the island of Hiw (Vanuatu)
 Hizb al-Ikha al-Watani, an Iraqi political party in the 1930s
 Highwire (protein), an E3 Ubiquitin Ligase frequently studied in Drosophila
 High Impact Wrestling Canada, a wrestling promotion